Essendon Lions is a now defunct football (soccer) club from the Melbourne suburb of Essendon, Victoria. At the club's peak in the 1960s and 1970s it played in the Victorian State League, the top league in Victoria at the time.

Honours
 Victorian Division 1 Champions – 1961 (North)
 Victorian Division 2 Champions – 1960
 Victorian Metropolitan League South Runners-Up: 1956, 1957

League record

League positions since 1956

Club history

Essendon Lions was formed as the Lions Soccer Club in 1953 by migrants from Ukraine in Australia. The club was named after the capital of Western Ukraine, Lviv (Coat of arms of Lviv).

In 1960, the club came first in the Second Division and were promoted to the First Division. In 1961, the club came first in the First Division and were promoted to the Victorian State League. In 1971, a ten-year lease in Victorian State League the club was relegated to Victorian Metropolitan League Division 1.

In 1974 club members of SC Croatia took over the financially struggling Essendon Lions. The first step occurred with the appointment of the influential SC Croatia figure Tony Vrzina as coach of the Essendon Lions late in the 1974 season, rescuing the club from relegation. With the completion of the season a total take-over of the club took place, with Croatia paying $25,000 to the Lions to take control of the club and the facilities at Montgomery Park in Essendon.

References

External links
 Statistics from OzFootball
 Українська футбольна діаспора

Defunct soccer clubs in Australia
Soccer clubs in Melbourne
Victorian State League teams
Association football clubs established in 1953
Ukrainian association football clubs outside Ukraine
1953 establishments in Australia
Essendon, Victoria
European-Australian culture
Diaspora sports clubs in Australia